Kate Elizabeth Bowen (born 15 April 1994) is a professional footballer from New Zealand who plays as a defensive midfielder for Melbourne City of the Australian A-League Women. She is a member of the New Zealand national team.

Early life

University of North Carolina
Bowen attended the University of North Carolina from 2012 to 2015, she was a part of the National Championship winning team in 2012.

Club career

FC Kansas City, 2016–2017
Bowen was selected by FC Kansas City with the 16th pick in the 2016 NWSL College Draft. Bowen appeared in 13 games in 2016. In 2017 she appeared in 22 games for FCKC and scored two goals.

Utah Royals FC, 2018–2020
After FC Kansas City ceased operations after the 2017 season, Bowen was officially added to the roster of the Utah Royals FC on 8 February 2018. She appeared in 19 matches for Utah in 2018, the Royals finished in 5th place and did not qualify for the playoffs.

Bowen returned to Utah for the 2019 NWSL season. She would miss several matches due to her participation in the 2019 Women's World Cup.

Kansas City, 2021
Kansas City waived Bowen in December 2021.

North Carolina Courage, 2022
North Carolina Courage signed Bowen on 21 January 2022, to a one year contract with an option to renew for the 2023 season. After playing in the 2022 NWSL Challenge Cup and making two appearances in the National Women's Soccer League, she was granted an early release to join an Australian club before the beginning of the 2022–23 A-League Women season.

Melbourne City, 2022
In November 2022, Bowen signed with Australian club Melbourne City.

International career
Born in Auckland, Bowen became the youngest player to represent New Zealand at recognised international level when she played in a New Zealand U-17 match against Australia U-17 on her 14th birthday in 2008. Later that year she travelled to the 2008 FIFA U-17 Women's World Cup where she made a solitary appearance as a late substitute in a 3–1 win over Colombia. She again represented New Zealand in 2010, this time as captain at the 2008 FIFA U-17 Women's World Cup in Trinidad and Tobago.

Bowen made her senior international début as a substitute in a 0–3 loss to Australia on 12 May 2011.

She featured in two of New Zealand's three matches at the 2011 FIFA Women's World Cup in Germany and in all three of her country's matches at the 2015 FIFA Women's World Cup in Canada. After being an alternate at the 2012 Olympics, Bowen was named to the 18-player roster for the 2016 Olympics in Rio where she appeared in all 3 matches for New Zealand.

In 2019, Bowen participated in her third World Cup. She played every minute of New Zealand's three group stage matches at the World Cup in France, they lost all three matches and did not advance to the knockout round.

International goals
Scores and results list New Zealand's goal tally first.

Honours

College
University of North Carolina
 NCAA Women's Soccer Championship: 2012

International
 OFC Women's Nations Cup: 2018

References

External links

 Profile at NZF
 
 Caps 'n' Goals

1994 births
Living people
Association footballers from Auckland
Footballers at the 2016 Summer Olympics
Expatriate women's soccer players in the United States
FC Kansas City draft picks
FC Kansas City players
National Women's Soccer League players
New Zealand expatriate sportspeople in the United States
New Zealand women's association footballers
New Zealand women's international footballers
North Carolina Tar Heels women's soccer players
Olympic association footballers of New Zealand
Utah Royals FC players
Women's association football defenders
2011 FIFA Women's World Cup players
2015 FIFA Women's World Cup players
2019 FIFA Women's World Cup players
Kansas City Current players
Footballers at the 2020 Summer Olympics
North Carolina Courage players
Melbourne City FC (A-League Women) players
New Zealand expatriate women's association footballers